Inambari District is one of four districts of the province Tambopata in Peru.

References